Val en Vignes is a commune in the department of Deux-Sèvres, western France. The municipality was established on 1 January 2017 by merger of the former communes of Cersay (the seat), Bouillé-Saint-Paul and Massais.

See also 
Communes of the Deux-Sèvres department

References 

Communes of Deux-Sèvres